SPMS may refer to one of the following:

 South Pasadena Middle School, a public middle school located in South Pasadena, California
 South Pointe Middle School, in Walnut, California
 Airport code for Moisés Benzaquén Rengifo Airport in Peru.
Secondary progressive multiple sclerosis